The International Practice Management Association (IPMA) is a membership-based professional organization that promotes the development, professional standing and visibility of paralegal and legal practice support management professionals. Its membership consists of paralegal managers and other practice support managers (those who manage non-attorney fee earners in law firms and legal departments).

Goals

According to its website, the IPMA’s primary goals are:

 To be the premier resource for information and education on the management of paralegals and other practice support professionals in law firms and law departments globally;
 To advocate for the effective use and management of these professionals;
 To promote and enhance the proficiency and professionalism of its members; and
 To provide thought leadership to the membership, the legal industry and the public at large on the value of utilization and management of paralegals and other practice support professionals.

IPMA Activities

Position Papers

The IPMA produces position papers on topics relating to paralegal regulation and the paralegal and practice management profession more generally.
Current position papers include:
 IPMA Position Paper on Paralegal Education
 IPMA Position Paper on US Paralegal Regulation
 IPMA Position Paper on Paralegal Regulation in Canada - English Version
 Déclaration de Principe Sur la Réglementation des Parajuristes au Canada

Paralegal Management Magazine

Paralegal Management is the IPMA's flagship publication, which contains articles on legal management and current issues in the paralegal and practice support profession.

Annual Conference

The IPMA hosts an Annual Conference & Expo that includes workshops, general sessions, networking events and a supplier trade show for legal practice support managers and IPMA affiliates.

Compensation Survey

In connection with ALM Legal Intelligence, the IPMA produces the Annual Compensation Survey for Paralegals/Legal Assistants and Managers.  The Survey provides a benchmark for law firms and corporate/in-house law departments on paralegal compensation and management practices. The Survey reports on 11 distinct paralegal positions from the most senior Paralegal Manager to Clerk.

History

The IPMA was founded as the Legal Assistant Management Association ("LAMA") in Washington D.C. in 1984. It was renamed the International Paralegal Management Association on January 1, 2005.  In 2014, reflecting changes in the industry and its membership, the IPMA membership voted to change its name to the International Practice Management Association, serving not only paralegal managers but also other managers in law firms and law departments who manage practice support professionals.

References

Law-related professional associations